Zannichellia palustris, the horned pondweed, is a plant found in fresh to brackish waters in the United States (especially in the Chesapeake Bay), Europe, Asia, Australasia, and South America. It is recognizable by its long, thread like leaves, and "stringy" appearance. Its roots are also long and tendril-like, and its seeds bear a distinctive horned shape, hence the common name.
The species epithet palustris is Latin for "of the marsh" and indicates its common habitat. A diploid, its chromosome number was confirmed as 2n = 24.

References

Potamogetonaceae
Aquatic plants
Flora of Europe
Flora of North America
Flora of temperate Asia
Plants described in 1753
Taxa named by Carl Linnaeus